The Süderelbe (Southern Elbe) is the biggest anabranch of the Unterelbe river in the area which is now the Port of Hamburg, Germany. Its natural flow path was redirected through the Köhlbrand.

See also
List of bridges in Hamburg
List of rivers of Hamburg

Elbe
Rivers of Hamburg
Federal waterways in Germany
0Suderelbe
Rivers of Germany